The Elections Act 2022 is an Act of the Parliament of the United Kingdom, introduced to the House of Commons in July 2021, and receiving Royal Assent on 28 April 2022. The Act introduces a requirement for voter photo identification for in-person voting to Great Britain for the first time. It will give government new powers over the independent elections regulator; the Electoral Commission has said it is "concerned" about its independence from political influence in the future. According to academic research presented to the House of Commons, these changes may result in 1.1 million fewer voters at the next general election due to the photo ID requirement.

Key elements of the act were opposed by parliamentary committees, the House of Lords, the Electoral Commission, devolved governments, and academics. Changes proposed by the House of Lords were rejected by Boris Johnson's government. William Wallace, Baron Wallace of Saltaire, described it as a "nefarious piece of legislation" that is "shabby and illiberal". Toby James, a professor of politics and public policy, has said "the inclusiveness of elections has been undermined by the act and it weakens the UK’s claim to be a beacon of democracy". The Labour Party said the Conservatives are "trying to rig the rules of the game to help themselves".

Background 
Other countries with compulsory voter ID laws tend to also have compulsory national identity cards, whereas the United Kingdom does not (the Labour government's attempt to introduce them, on the legal basis of the Identity Cards Act 2006, was abandoned by the Conservative/Liberal Democrat coalition government and repealed in 2011). The government's research suggests that 9% of voters do not have eligible identification. A lack of eligible identification is more common in individuals who are disabled, unemployed, or without educational qualifications. In response to this, the government announced that identification which had a photograph in which the likeness was similar would be permissible even if the identification in question had expired, which they stated would reduce the percentage of eligible voters without any form of eligible identification to 4% based on their research.

There is little evidence of serious voter fraud in UK elections. Between 2015 and 2019, during which three general elections were held and 153 million in-person votes cast, only 88 allegations were made of voter fraud. Between 2010 and 2018, there were just two convictions for voter fraud. 

Photographic identification is mandatory to vote in elections in Northern Ireland.

A voter ID trial was held for the 2018 United Kingdom local elections by the national Conservative government. Voters in five local authorities in England (Bromley, Gosport, Swindon, Watford and Woking) were required to show ID before voting. The legal basis for the trial has been contested.

Voter ID legislation was part of the 2021 Queen's Speech.

On 16 January 2023 the Voter Authority Certificate service was launched, allowing UK electors to obtain a free form of photo ID specially for voting.

Provisions 

Notable provisions of the act include:

 Requiring photo identification to vote in-person.
 Ability for government ministers to provide a "strategy and policy statement", containing government priorities for elections, to the Electoral Commission. Commissioners must have due regard for the statement and publish annual reports explaining what actions they have taken to implement it.
 Changes to the Electoral Commission, including placing it under the supervision of a government minister. It was previously independent of government and accountable directly to parliament.
 Changing mayoral and police and crime commissioner elections from a supplementary vote system to a first-past-the-post one.
 Removing the restriction on British citizens who have been resident overseas for more than 15 consecutive years from voting in UK elections.
 Changes to voter eligibility of EU citizens. EU citizens living in the UK prior to 1 January 2021 will be allowed to vote in future UK local elections. EU citizens arriving in the UK after that date will only be allowed to vote if there is a reciprocal agreement for UK citizens resident in that country.

Other provisions include extending the current imprint rules onto digital election material, and tightening spending limits on third parties.

Criticism 
The act was criticised for permitting as acceptable voter identification "an Older Person’s Bus Pass, an Oyster 60+ Card, a Freedom Pass", while not allowing 18+ student Oyster cards, national railcards, or student ID cards. An amendment in the House of Lords to list these as accepted forms of voter identification was rejected by the Conservative government. Critics have said the list discriminates against younger people, who more often vote Labour; in the 2019 United Kingdom general election 56% of voters aged 18–24 voted Labour whereas 67% of 70+ voters voted Conservative, according to polling by YouGov. The government has stated that these forms of ID were rejected on the grounds that, compared to their equivalents for older citizens, they have less stringent application requirements and thus were less secure.

The Labour Party has accused the government of trying to "choose voters". A column in The National said the real intention of the act is to make it harder for anti-Conservative demographics to vote.

The government's argument that public concern about vote fraud (with two-thirds of voters reporting concern about the phenomenon) necessitated the introduction of identification to reduce concern was criticised by the Public Administration and Constitutional Affairs Committee on the grounds that public perception of electoral integrity tends exaggerate the extent of the issue.

Bob Kerslake, former Head of the Home Civil Service, has claimed the changes to mayoral and police elections are motivated by a perceived advantage the Conservatives have under first-past-the-post due to vote splitting. Kerslake noted that of the past ten metro mayors, only two have been Conservative.

The Electoral Commissioners wrote to government ministers urging for the independence of the commission to be retained. The letter said "it is our firm and shared view that [...] enabling the government to guide the work of the commission is inconsistent with the role that an independent electoral commission plays in a healthy democracy". It added that "the Statement has no precedent in the accountability arrangements of electoral commissions in other comparable democracies, such as Canada, Australia or New Zealand."

References 

Election law in the United Kingdom
Election legislation
United Kingdom Acts of Parliament 2022
2022 in British law